Joe Walcott is the name of two championship boxers:
Barbados Joe Walcott (1873–1935), boxer from British Guiana
Jersey Joe Walcott (1914–1994), boxer from New Jersey, United States